The North Swedish Horse is a Swedish breed of small heavy horse. It is closely related to the similar Dølehest breed of Norway. It was traditionally used for forestry and agricultural work. Lighter lines are bred for harness racing, and are registered in the stud-book of the Svensk Kallblodstravare (Swedish Coldblood Trotter).

History and breeding

Nowadays, breeding of the North Swedish Horse is strictly controlled, and the animals intended for breeding are thoroughly tested. The primary qualities desired in a breeding horse are good character, pulling capacity and fertility. The legs and hooves are examined by X-ray.

Characteristics

The North Swedish horse is agile and easy to train. Its conformation is compact and robust, while being relatively light for a draft horse. Regarding its small size it is very strong and durable, and it has an energetic, long-strided trot. A typical character is gentle and willing. The breed is known for its longevity and great health.

Use
The North Swedish Horse is one of the few cold-blood breeds used in harness racing. A world record for coldblood trotters of 1:17.9 per kilometre was set in 2005 by Järvsöfaks, who is of part Swedish, part Norwegian lineage. North Swedish Horses are well suited for agricultural and forestry work. In Sweden they are popular for recreational equestrian activities.

References

Horse breeds
Horse breeds originating in Sweden